Water ash is a common name for several plants and may refer to:

 Acer negundo
 Fraxinus caroliniana